Cao Cao is a Chinese television series based on the life of Cao Cao, a warlord who rose to power towards the end of the Eastern Han dynasty and laid the foundation for the state of Cao Wei in the Three Kingdoms period. Directed by Hu Mei, the series aimed to portray a more historically accurate image of Cao Cao, who is traditionally depicted as a villain in Chinese culture. Starring Zhao Lixin as the eponymous character, the series was filmed at the Xiangshan Film City in Ningbo, Zhejiang between 1 November 2011 and 15 March 2012.

Cao Cao was not broadcast in China until 7 September 2015, when it started airing on Anhui Satellite TV and LeTV. Before that, the series had already been released on DVD in Japan on 4 September 2013. It was also aired on Channel Ginga in Japan on 5 January 2014, and on Chunghwa TV in South Korea from 6 October to 28 November 2014.

Plot
The series is divided into seven parts spanning 41 episodes. It covers Cao Cao's life from his adolescent years and early career to the period just before the Battle of Red Cliffs.

Cast

 Zhao Lixin as Cao Cao
 Wang Han as Cao Cao (child)
 Gong Jie as Lady Bian
 Lei Kesheng as Cao Jie
 Li Lingyu as Lady Ding
 Leo Ku as Kong Rong
 Li Wenbo as Cao Song
 Jia Zhaoji as Cao Teng
 Yan Kun as Guo Jia
 Kan Jinming as Xun Yu
 Han Han as Cao Hong
 Sun Xuezheng as Cao Ren
 Chen Zexi as Cao Ang
 Feng Yizhe as Cao Ang (child)
 Shen Bo as Cao Anmin
 Guo Zhan as Cao Pi
 Yin Junzheng as Xiahou Dun
 Wang Bin as Li Dian
 Wang Zhao as Xiahou Yuan
 Yun Feng as Cheng Yu
 Ding Jun as Zhang Liao
 Wu Hao as Yu Jin
 Zhao Mingming as Xu Chu
 Sun Yucheng as Dian Wei
 Wang Zhong as Yue Jin
 Sun Qi as Jia Xu
 Yan Kun as Liu Hong (Emperor Ling)
 Lin Miaoke as Liu Hong (Emperor Ling) (child)
 Zhao Xuelian as Empress He
 Li Ying as Empress Dowager Dong
 Jiang Yi as Liu Xie (Emperor Xian)
 Sun Xikun as Liu Xie (Emperor Xian) (child)
 Jin Mengqian as Lady Dong
 Ma Danni as Lady Tang
 Sun Hongtao as Yuan Shao
 Ding Kai as Yuan Shu
 Zhang Bo as Guo Tu
 Ma Yong as Shen Pei
 Lu Ya'ning as Xu You
 Li Jia as Zhang He
 Li Cong as Gao Lan
 Cao Zheng as Ju Shou
 Chen Youning as Yuan Tan
 Guo Kai as Yuan Xi
 Li Junbo as Yuan Shang
 Jin Pinglong as Yan Liang
 Zhang Qinglong as Wen Chou
 Hu Jian as Tian Feng
 Han Xue as Diaochan
 Zhang Yujie as Cai Wenji
 Sun Wanqing as Cai Yong
 Zhu Yanping as He Jin
 Cheng Wenkuan as Jian Shuo
 Shi Liming as Dong Zhuo
 Li Xiaowen as Wang Yun
 Gao Wen as Chen Gong
 Lu Yijie as Chen Gong (child)
 Ge Ziming as Zhang Miao
 Yang Wei as Liu Bei
 Zhang Yiqun as Guan Yu
 Li Long as Zhang Fei
 Ying Feng as Lü Bu
 Zhao Xiaoguang as Han Fu
 Hao Gang as He Yong
 Yang Tianpeng as Li Jue
 Wang Tong as Guo Si
 Jia Wei as Bao Xin
 Li Ming as Dong Cheng
 Zhang Wenming as Zhang Xiu
 Wang Wei as Chen Deng
 Ma Xiaojun as Ji Ben
 Hu Xiaomeng as Sima Yi (child)
 Fang Shuai as Bo Cai
 Li Zijing as Yituzhiyashi
 Jing Qing as Xiongnu prince
 Yue Hong as brothel owner
 Wang Chen as brothel owner
 Wang Wenwen as pregnant woman

See also
 List of media adaptations of Romance of the Three Kingdoms

References

External links
  Cao Cao (TV series) page on cinemart.co.jp
  Cao Cao (TV series) page on Chunghwa TV's website

2014 Chinese television series debuts
2014 Chinese television series endings
Television series set in the Eastern Han dynasty
Works based on Romance of the Three Kingdoms
Chinese historical television series